Sarconeurum glaciale is a species of moss in Antarctica.  It lives in Ross Island and Southern Victoria Land in Antarctica, and on Tierra del Fuego.

References
Ecosystem processes in Antarctic ice-free landscapes
Antarctic communities: species, structure, and survival

Pottiaceae
Flora of Antarctica
Flora of South Argentina
Flora of southern Chile